The 2018 Texas A&M Aggies football team represents Texas A&M University in the 2018 NCAA Division I FBS football season. The Aggies play their home games at Kyle Field in College Station, Texas and compete in the Western Division of the Southeastern Conference (SEC). They were led by first-year head coach Jimbo Fisher.

Previous season
The Aggies finished the 2017 season 7–6, 4–4 in SEC play, to finish in a tie for fourth place in the Western Division. They were invited to the Belk Bowl, where they lost to Wake Forest. This season was the first time since 2009 that Texas A&M was not ranked in the AP Poll during the regular season.

On November 26, 2017, Texas A&M fired head coach Kevin Sumlin. He finished at Texas A&M with a six-year record of 51–26. Interim head coach Jeff Banks led the Aggies in the Belk Bowl. On December 2, 2017, A&M hired Florida State head coach Jimbo Fisher as Sumlin's replacement.

Recruiting

Position key

Recruits

The Aggies signed a total of 23 recruits.

Preseason

Award watch lists
Listed in the order that they were released

SEC media poll
The SEC media poll was released on July 20, 2018, with the Aggies predicted to finish in fourth place in the West Division.

Preseason All-SEC teams
The Aggies had five players selected to the preseason all-SEC teams.

Offense

2nd team

Trayveon Williams – RB

3rd team

Erik McCoy – C

Defense

3rd team

Kingsley Keke – DL

Landis Durham – DL

Specialists

2nd team

Daniel LaCamera – K

Schedule

Schedule Source:

Personnel

Roster

Coaching staff

Game summaries

Northwestern State

Middle linebacker Otaro Alaka was ejected in the 1st quarter due to targeting. Safety Donovan Wilson was ejected in the 2nd quarter, also for targeting.

Clemson

Louisiana–Monroe

at No. 1 Alabama

vs. Arkansas

Kentucky

at South Carolina

at Mississippi State

at Auburn

Ole Miss

UAB

LSU

With a final score of 74–72 or 146 combined points, the game became the highest-scoring game in NCAA FBS history. The game was also the fifth seven-overtime game in NCAA FBS history.

vs. NC State (Gator Bowl)

Rankings

Players drafted into the NFL

References

Texas AandM
Texas A&M Aggies football seasons
Gator Bowl champion seasons
Texas AandM Aggies football